Eristena mangalis is a moth in the family Crambidae. It was described by Dennis H. Murphy in 1989. It is found in Singapore.

References

Acentropinae
Moths described in 1989